The Mandyani is a river of southwestern mainland Equatorial Guinea. It forms part of the Muni Estuary along with the Mitong River, Congue River, Mitimele River, Utamboni River and Mven River.

References

Rivers of Equatorial Guinea